The 1985 Spanish motorcycle Grand Prix was the second round of the 1985 Grand Prix motorcycle racing season. It took place on the weekend of 4–5 May 1985 at the Circuito Permanente del Jarama.

Classification

500 cc

References

Spanish motorcycle Grand Prix
Spanish
Motorcycle
May 1985 sports events in Europe